Stan White may refer to:
 Stan White (linebacker) (born 1949), American football player
 Stan White (quarterback) (born 1971), American football player
 Stan White (politician), North Carolina state senator